The 2019 Samford Bulldogs football team represents Samford University in the 2019 NCAA Division I FCS football season. They are led by fifth-year head coach Chris Hatcher and play their home games at Seibert Stadium. They are a member of the Southern Conference (SoCon).

Previous season

The Bulldogs finished the 2018 season 6–5, 5–3 in SoCon play to finish in fourth place.

Preseason

Preseason media poll
The SoCon released their preseason media poll and coaches poll on July 22, 2019. The Bulldogs were picked to finish in sixth place in both polls.

Preseason All-SoCon Teams
The Bulldogs placed four players on the preseason all-SoCon teams.

Offense

1st team

Nick Nixon – OL

Defense

2nd team

Justin Foster – DL

Nelson Jordan – DL

Specialists

1st team

Mitchell Fineran – K

Schedule

Game summaries

vs. Youngstown State

at Tennessee Tech

at Wofford

Alabama A&M

The Citadel

Furman

at VMI

East Tennessee State

at Mercer

Chattanooga

at Western Carolina

at Auburn

Ranking movements

References

Samford
Samford Bulldogs football seasons
Samford Bulldogs football